ASP.NET Core is a free and open-source web framework and successor to ASP.NET, developed by Microsoft. It is a modular framework that runs on both the full .NET Framework, on Windows, and the cross-platform .NET. However, ASP.NET Core version 3 only works on .NET Core, dropping support of the .NET Framework.

The framework is a complete rewrite that unites the previously separate ASP.NET MVC and ASP.NET Web API into a single programming model.

Despite being a new framework, built on a new web stack, it does have a high degree of concept compatibility with ASP.NET. The ASP.NET Core framework supports side-by-side versioning so that different applications being developed on a single machine can target different versions of ASP.NET Core. This is not possible with previous versions of ASP.NET.

Blazor is a recent (optional) component to support WebAssembly and since version 5.0, it has dropped support for some old web browsers. While current Microsoft Edge works, the legacy version of it, i.e. "Microsoft Edge Legacy" and Internet Explorer 11 are dropped when you use Blazor.

Release history

Naming 
Originally deemed ASP.NET vNext, the framework was going to be called ASP.NET 5 when ready. However, in order to avoid implying it is an update to the existing ASP.NET framework, Microsoft later changed the name to ASP.NET Core at the 1.0 release.

Features 
 No-compile developer experience (i.e. compilation is continuous, so that the developer does not have to invoke the compilation command)
 Modular framework distributed as NuGet packages
 Cloud-optimized runtime (optimized for the internet)
 Host-agnostic via Open Web Interface for .NET (OWIN) support – runs in IIS or standalone
 A unified story for building web UI and web APIs (i.e. both the same)
 A cloud-ready environment-based configuration system
 A light-weight and modular HTTP request pipeline
 Build and run cross-platform ASP.NET Core apps on Windows, Mac, and Linux
 Open-source and community-focused
 Side-by-side app versioning when targeting .NET
 In-built support for dependency injection

Components 
 Entity Framework (EF) Core
 Identity Core
 MVC Core
 Razor Core
 SignalR
 Blazor
 Kestrel web server

See also 

 .NET Compiler Platform
 Mono
 Visual Studio Code

References

External links 

 
 ASP.NET on GitHub
 ASP.NET on website
 Announcing ASP.NET Core 2.1 RC 

VNext
Web frameworks
Microsoft free software
Software using the Apache license